Pitcairnia cana is a plant species in the genus Pitcairnia. This species is endemic to Venezuela.

References

cana
Flora of Venezuela